Stylus is a user style manager, a browser extension for changing the look and feel of pages.

History 
Stylus was forked from Stylish for Chrome in 2017 after Stylish was bought by the analytics company SimilarWeb. The initial objective was to "remove any and all analytics, and return to a more user-friendly UI." It restored the user interface of Stylish 1.5.2 and removed Google Analytics.

Reception 
Martin Brinkmann reported in May 2017 that "Stylus works as expected". As of December 2020, Stylus had more than 400,000 users on Google Chrome and nearly 70,000 users on Firefox. At that same time, it had an average rating of 4.6 stars on the Chrome Web Store and 4.5 stars on Firefox Add-ons.

See also 

 Stylish

References

External links 

 Official website
 GitHub page
 Userstyles.org

Free Firefox WebExtensions
Google Chrome extensions
Cascading Style Sheets
Browsers